Waycross may refer to:

Waycross, Georgia
Waycross College (1973-2013), former two-year public college
Waycross, Indiana, religious retreat owned by the Episcopal Diocese of Indianapolis
Waycross, an American country music duo known for originally recording the song "Nineteen"